Héctor Elizondo (born December 22, 1936) is an American character actor. He is known for playing Phillip Watters in the television series Chicago Hope (1994–2000) and Ed Alzate in the television series Last Man Standing (2011–2021). His film roles include The Taking of Pelham One Two Three (1974), American Gigolo (1980), Leviathan (1989), Pretty Woman (1990), Beverly Hills Cop III (1994), Runaway Bride (1999), The Princess Diaries (2001), and Valentine's Day (2010).

Elizondo is the recipient of an Obie Award, a Primetime Emmy Award, and two ALMA Awards. He has also received nominations for a Drama Desk Award, a Golden Globe Award, a Satellite Award, and five Screen Actors Guild Awards.

Early years
Elizondo was born in New York, the son of Carmen Medina Reyes and Martín Echevarría Elizondo, a notary public and accountant. His parents were Puerto Ricans of Spanish descent who moved from Puerto Rico to New York City with the hope of finding a better life.  He grew up on the Upper West Side.

At a young age, he demonstrated a talent for sports and music. He sang for the Frank Murray Boys' Choir when he was 10 years old. Upon graduating from junior high school in 1950, he enrolled in the High School of the Performing Arts. He also attended another public high school, where he excelled in basketball and baseball. His baseball skills were good enough for him to be scouted by both the San Francisco Giants and the Pittsburgh Pirates. In 1954, Elizondo enrolled in City College of New York, intending to become a history teacher. However, during his freshman year, he became a father and dropped out of college, going to work full-time to support his family. Later, he divorced and gained full custody of his son, Rodd.

Career
From 1962 to 1963, Elizondo studied dance at the Ballet Arts Company at Carnegie Hall. During 1962–63, he also studied acting under Mario Stiletti at Stella Adler Theatre Studio when it was located in the Dryden East Hotel on East 39th St. In 1965, he landed a part in the off-Broadway show Kill the One-Eyed Man.

In 1968, he got a part in the play The Great White Hope. His first major success came when he played "God" in the guise of a Puerto Rican steam room attendant in Steambath, for which he won an Obie Award for his performance. Many of his roles involve playing a friend of or sympathizer to the lead character.

In 1974, Elizondo played an ex-mafioso-turned-subway hijacker "Mr. Grey" in The Taking of Pelham One Two Three.

He starred as a Puerto Rican widower on the CBS television series, Popi (1975–76). The short-lived series, which ran for 11 episodes, was one of the first American network television series to feature a Latino theme and cast. In 1975, he portrayed the murderer in an episode of Columbo, "A Case of Immunity". He was a member of the cast of the 1985–86 CBS situation comedy Foley Square, starring Margaret Colin.

In the 1980s, Elizondo befriended Garry Marshall, who was impressed with his talent. Their first film together was Young Doctors in Love, in which Elizondo displays his guitar-playing talent. His role in Pretty Woman lasted only 10 minutes, but led to a Golden Globe nomination. In 1999, he co-starred in Runaway Bride as Fisher, the husband of the male protagonist's ex. Elizondo has participated in more than 80 films (18 of which have been Marshall's). He appeared in every film that Marshall directed, including a brief appearance as a Portuguese fisherman in Overboard, which starred Kurt Russell and Goldie Hawn.

In 2001, he was featured in the short-lived television drama Kate Brasher and portrayed security head Joe in the film The Princess Diaries, a role he reprised in the 2004 sequel, The Princess Diaries 2: Royal Engagement. As a voice-actor, he played Bane in Batman: Mystery of the Batwoman. He may be best known to television audiences as Dr. Phillip Watters on the CBS television series Chicago Hope created by well-known television creator David E. Kelley. He has won both an Emmy and ALMA award and was nominated for a Satellite Award and several SAG Awards for playing this role. He is one of only two people to remain on the show for its entire run, the other being Adam Arkin.

On April 30, 2008, USA Network announced that Elizondo would be cast on Monk as Dr. Neven Bell, Adrian Monk's new psychiatrist, following the sudden death of Stanley Kamel, the actor who played Monk's original psychiatrist, earlier that month.

From 2011 to 2021, Elizondo played Ed Alzate on the Fox (formerly ABC) comedy Last Man Standing, starring Tim Allen and Nancy Travis.

In January 2023, Elizondo guest voiced a character, Romar Adell, a local of Serenno who went into hiding after the Empire bombarded the planet, on Star Wars: The Bad Batch.

Personal life
Elizondo has been married three times. He became a father at the age of 19 with his first wife. His son Rodd was born on September 5, 1956, and died in 2017 at the age of 60. Since 1969, he has been married to Carolee Campbell, an Emmy Award-winning actress who played nurse Carolee Simpson on The Doctors . They live in Sherman Oaks, California.

In April 2013, Elizondo participated in the Los Angeles Times Festival of Books, held at the University of Southern California, promoting children's reading. Proud of his Latino heritage, Elizondo does not accept roles that he feels are stereotypical and/or demeaning in any way.

Filmography

Film

Television

Awards and nominations
OBIE Award
 1971: Won, "Distinguished Performances" – Steambath

ALMA Awards
 1998: Nominated, "Outstanding Individual Performance in a Television Series in a Crossover Role" – Chicago Hope
 1998: Nominated, "Outstanding Individual Performance in a Television Series in a Crossover Role" – Turbulence
 1998: Won, "Outstanding Actor in a Made-for-Television Movie or Mini-Series" – Borrowed Hearts
 1999: Nominated, "Outstanding Individual Performance in a Television Series in a Crossover Role" – Chicago Hope
 2000: Nominated, "Outstanding Actor in a Feature Film" – Runaway Bride
 2000: Won, "Outstanding Actor in a Drama Series" – Chicago Hope
 2002: Nominated, "Outstanding Actor in a Motion Picture" – Tortilla Soup

Emmy Awards
 1992: Nominated, "Outstanding Supporting Actor in a Miniseries or a Special" – Mrs. Cage
 1995: Nominated, "Outstanding Supporting Actor in a Drama Series" – Chicago Hope
 1996: Nominated, "Outstanding Supporting Actor in a Drama Series" – Chicago Hope
 1997: Won, "Outstanding Supporting Actor in a Drama Series" – Chicago Hope
 1998: Nominated, "Outstanding Supporting Actor in a Drama Series" – Chicago Hope

Golden Globe Awards
 1991: Nominated, "Best Performance by an Actor in a Supporting Role in a Motion Picture" – Pretty Woman

Imagen Foundation Awards
 2005: Nominated, "Best Supporting Actor in a Film" – The Princess Diaries 2: Royal Engagement

NCLR Bravo Awards
 1996: Nominated, "Outstanding Television Series Actor in a Crossover Role" – Chicago Hope

Satellite Awards
 1997: Nominated, "Best Performance By an Actor in a Television Drama Series" – Chicago Hope

SAG Awards
 1995: Nominated, "Outstanding Performance by a Male Actor in a Drama Series" – Chicago Hope
 1997: Nominated, "Outstanding Performance by an Ensemble in a Drama Series" – Chicago Hope
 1998: Nominated, "Outstanding Performance by an Ensemble in a Drama Series" – Chicago Hope

Temecula Valley International Film Festival
 2006: Won, "Lifetime Achievement Award"

See also

List of Puerto Ricans

References

External links

1936 births
20th-century American male actors
21st-century American male actors
American male film actors
American male musical theatre actors
American male soap opera actors
American male television actors
American male voice actors
American people of Puerto Rican descent
Hispanic and Latino American male actors
Fiorello H. LaGuardia High School alumni
Living people
Male actors from New York City
Obie Award recipients
Outstanding Performance by a Supporting Actor in a Drama Series Primetime Emmy Award winners
People from the Upper West Side
People from Sherman Oaks, Los Angeles
American people of Basque descent
American people of Canarian descent
American people of Spanish descent